Polius is a surname. Notable people with the surname include:

 Angelina Phera Polius, Saint Lucian politician
 Bruno Polius (born 1958), French singer
 Dalton Polius, (born 1990), Saint Lucian cricketer
 Rupert Polius (born 1944), Saint Lucian cricketer

See also
 Pocius